Iraj Afshar (8 October 1925 – 9 March 2011) was a bibliographer, historian, scholar, professor, and an iconic figure in the field of Persian studies. Afshar was a professor emeritus of the University of Tehran. He was a consulting editor of Encyclopædia Iranica at Columbia University.

Biography 
He attended Zoroastrian Shāpour Secondary School and Firouz-Bahrām High School in Tajrish, Tehran. In 1945, he married Shayesteh Afsharieh and together they had four sons.

Iraj Afshar recorded the monuments of Yazd in his three-volume "yādegār-hāye Yazd (Monuments of Yazd)". He was known as, "the doyen of standard Persian language bibliographers". Afshar played a significant role in the development of the field of Iranology in Iran and throughout the world during the second half of the 20th century. He was the editor of Sokhan, a prolific Iranology journal, under the responsibility of Parviz Natel-Khanlari and also the editor of rāhnamāye ketāb (Bibliography Guide), Mehr, farhang-e Iranzamin (Culture of Iran) and Ayandeh.

He was the chief bibliographer of Persian books at Harvard University. Afshar was associated with UNESCO and taught at the University of Bern and University of Tehran.

He was on the advisory council for the Iranian Studies Journal.

Biographical timeline 

1925: Birth in Tehran, Iran (Father: Dr. Mahmoud  Afshar, Mother: Nosrat Barazandeh)
1933–1945: Attended Zoroastrian  Shāpour Secondary School and Firouz-Bahrām High School in Tajrish, Tehran
1944–1946: Manager of Ayandeh Journal
1945: Received Diploma in Literature
1945: Marriage to Shayesteh Afsharieh
1945–1949: Attended University of Tehran majoring in Law, thesis: Minorities in Iran
1946–1955: Collaboration with jahān-e now (New World) Journal (Editor in Chief: Hossein Hejazi)
1950: Employed by Ministry of Culture and Education  as educator at Sharif High School and Gharib High School
1951–1960: Librarian – Law Library of University of Tehran – with encouragement from Dr. Mohsen Sabah and Mohammad-Taqi Danesh-Pajouh 
1952–1953: Editor-in-Chief of Mehr Journal (licensee: Majeed Movaqqar)
1952-2011: Founder and Managing Editor of farhang-e Irānzamin Journal (in association with Mohammad-Taqi Danesh-Pajouh, Manoucher Sotoudeh, Mostafa Mogharrabi, Abbas Zaryab Khoyee)
1963–1966: Publication of ketābhāy-e Iran (Books of Iran) (Annual bibliography) 
1954–1956: Editor-in-Chief of Sokhan Journal (licensee: Dr. Parviz Natel-Khanlari)
1955–1961: Director ketābhāy-e māh (Books of the Month) Journal (Publication of Society of Publishers with cooperation of Franklin Publishing Corporation)
1956–1963: Acting Managing Director bongāh-e tarjomeh o nasher-e ketāb (Institute for Translation and Publishing of Books)
1956–1957: Attended UNESCO Educational and Practical Library Science training in Europe
1957–1958: Co-founder bāshgāh-e ketāb (Book Club) later named anjoman-e ketāb (Book Society)
1958–1969: Educator Library Science at dāneshsarāy-e ālee (Higher Education) division of University of Tehran
1958–1979: Managing Editor rāhnamāy-e ketāb Journal (licensee: Ehsan Yarshater)
1958–1979: Director anjoman-e ketāb (Book Society)
1961–1979: Founder nashriyeh noskhehāy-e khatti  (Journal of Manuscripts), Central Library of University of Tehran (in collaboration with Mohammad-Taqi Danesh-Pajouh)
1961–1962: Director of the Library of dāneshsarāy-e āli
1962: Director National Library of Iran (founded Iranian Studies Branch, founded Bibliography of Iran and indexing of library's manuscripts with efforts of Abdollah Anvar)
1962: Return to teaching at dāneshsarā-e āli
1963–1964: Return to University of Tehran as Director of Center of Bibliographic Research and Indexing 
1963: Indexing and Cataloging Harvard University printed Persian books
1963: Technical Manager of Library Sciences Literacy Committee (UNESCO National commission)
1964–1971: Director of Bureau of Publications and Cultural Relations (Later named Bureau of Publications and Library Relations)
1965–1979: Director of Central Library and Document Center, University of Tehran
1965–1973: Teaching at Iran Historical Social Divisions dāneshkadeh olum ejtemāee (Department of Social Sciences) University of Tehran
1966–1979: Founded ketābdāri Journal, a publication of University of Tehran Central Library
1969: Director National Book Center interrelated to UNESCO National Commission
1969–1979: Associate Professor, later Professor of History (Historical Documents and Native History) Department of Literature and Human Sciences, University of Tehran.  (Manuscripts in Library Science) College of Educational Sciences
1969–1972: Director Iranshenāsi Journal, Publication of Department of Literature and Human Sciences, University of Tehran
1969–1979: Permanent Director of Congress of Iranian Studies
1979–1983: Established sāzemān-e ketāb (independently)
1979–1993: Published Ayandeh Journal from 5th volume for fifteen years 
1983: Death of father (Dr. Mahmoud Afshar, PhD.)
1984: Established nāmvāreh-e Dr. Mahmoud Afshar published by Doctor Mahmoud Afshar Foundation.  From 11th volume it was named pajouhesh-hāye Irāni (Iranian Studies/Research)
1989: Teaching at Bern University, Bern Switzerland
1996: Death of spouse (Shayesteh Afsharieh) 
1998: Cataloging Persian manuscripts at Austrian National Library (Vienna) 
2001: Established daftar-e tārikh, publishing small documents and thesis from Doctor Mahmoud Afshar Foundation

Memberships 

1951: Society of Iranian Studies  (President Ebrahim Pourdavoud and Secretary Dr. Mohammad Moien) 
1955–1978: Founding Member Iranian Society of Philosophy and Human Sciences affiliated with UNESCO national committee
1958: Ministry of Foreign Relation's Library Council
1959: Committee to establish countrywide archiving representing UNESCO national committee
1962: University of Tehran Central Library council
1962: Executive Council "Institute of research in literature and Iranian languages council" (Ministry of Culture and Art)
1964–1978: Board to select book (Ministry of Culture, Ministry of Education, Ministry of Culture and Art)
1965: Executive Board (Center for Research and introduction of Iranian Civilization and Culture)
1965: Board of Founders Iranian Society of History of Science and Medicine
1972–1976: Council of Tehran Public Libraries
1972–1978: Book of the Year Award Committee
1972–1976: Iran Librarian Society
1974–1978: Executive Board "History Society" affiliated with "Language and Literature Cultural Center" Also the secretary of the Cultural Center 
1974: Board of Trusties "Mojtaba Minavi Endowment Library" and Shahnameh Foundation
1976: Board of Trusties "Sayeed Mohammad-Ali Jamalzadeh Publish works" consigned to University of Tehran
1977: Selected guardian  "Mohammad Fateh Endowment Dormitory" University of Tehran 
1977–1978: Board of Trusties "Iran Cultural Foundation"
1977–1978: Supreme Council of "Iran National Documents"
1979–1982: Board of Founders National Monuments  Society
1979: Europe Iranian Studies Society
1983: Council of Custodians Doctor Mahmud Afshar Foundation  (Selected Custodian)
1989: Honorary Member Institute of Central and West Asian Studies, Karachi
1990: Board of Experts al-Furqān, Islamic Heritage Foundation
1993: Consulting Editor Encyclopædia Iranica
1993: Board of Trusties Dr. Ali-Akbar Siasi Endowment Library, University of Yazd
1997: Honorary Member Society of Iranian Studies (U.S.A)
1997: Supreme Council Center for the Great Islamic Encyclopedia (CGIE)
1998: Supreme Council National Library (Iran)
2000: Council of experts nāmehye bahārestān (Journal of Manuscript Research and Studies)
2001: Council of Guardians Eurasian Studies Journal (Italy)

See also 
 Iranology
Encyclopædia Iranica
Dastur al-Muluk
 Ehsan Yarshater
 Alireza Feyz
 Mehdi Bayani

References

External links 
Iran and Iranian Studies: Essays in Honor of Iraj Afshar
 Iraj Afshar's lecture on Persian constitutional revolution
 Iraj Afshar biography
Iraj Afshar Research Trove
 Ayandeh cover gallery

1925 births
2011 deaths
Academic staff of the University of Tehran
Iranian Iranologists
Iranian bibliographers
20th-century Iranian historians
Linguists from Iran
People from Yazd
Burials at artist's block of Behesht-e Zahra
Heads of the National Library of Iran